Robert Keith Burch (born 8 October 1983) is an English former professional footballer who played as a goalkeeper. He is the goalkeeping coach at Championship club AFC Bournemouth.

As a player he was goalkeeper in a career that lasted from 2002 until 2012. Having come through the youth academy at Tottenham Hotspur he went on to notably feature for several seasons at Lincoln City and amassed 92 of his 124 League appearances for the Imps. He also played for Woking, Stevenage, West Ham United, Bristol City, Barnet, Sheffield Wednesday and Notts County.

Club career
Burch turned professional with Tottenham Hotspur in July 2002 and spent a further five years at the club after signing professional forms.

During that time Burch was loaned out to Conference clubs Woking, in 2003, and Stevenage Borough, in 2004, to gain some first-team experience.

On 10 December 2004 he joined West Ham United on a month's loan to act as cover for Stephen Bywater whilst James Walker recovered from a groin operation; he was given the squad number 41. With Walker returning to fitness, Burch returned to Spurs at the end of the month's loan. In his time at Upton Park he was an unused substitute on six occasions. Indeed, injuries restricted Burch to just seven reserve team appearances in 2004–05.

On 31 August 2005 he joined Bristol City on an initial one-month loan deal, being given the squad number 23. In his time at Ashton Gate, Burch acted as understudy to Steve Phillips whilst the club underwent a change of management with Gary Johnson succeeding Brian Tinnion. Johnson extended Burch's loan period for a second month to enable him to take a closer look at the keeper. However, Burch sustained a knee injury which saw the arrival of Adriano Basso at the club and his return to Tottenham Hotspur.

He finally made his Football League debut on loan at Barnet when he was signed on an emergency 28-day loan on 30 January 2007. He made his debut for the Bees against Notts County.

Burch was released from his contract by Tottenham on 19 May 2007 and signed for Sheffield Wednesday on 2 July. He made his Wednesday debut on 28 August in a 2–1 League Cup second round victory over Hartlepool United. He was released by the club at the end of the season after playing just three competitive matches. Burch agreed to sign for Lincoln City on 30 June 2008.

Burch rejected a new contract with Lincoln in May 2010 and on 8 June he signed a two-year deal for League One club Notts County on a free transfer, after his contract with Lincoln City expired.

In May 2012 he was released by the club, along with 12 other players.

Coaching career
On 21 June 2019, Fulham announced Burch as their new goalkeeping coach having previously held coaching roles with Tottenham Hotspur and The Football Association.

International career
Burch is a former England Under-20 keeper.

Personal life
Robert Burch grew up in West Camel with his parents Keith and Barbara, as well as his older sister Fran. He attended Countess Gytha Primary School in Queen Camel. After primary school Rob attended Ansford Community School in Ansford, which is now known as Ansford Academy. 
Burch proposed to his girlfriend on the This Morning television programme on 14 February 2008. She is a producer on the show, and he surprised her backstage with a little help from Fern Britton The couple were married in 2009.

References

External links
 (Soccerbase have spread Burch's stats over two pages)
 (Soccerbase have spread Burch's stats over two pages)

1984 births
Living people
People from Yeovil
English footballers
Association football goalkeepers
Tottenham Hotspur F.C. players
Woking F.C. players
Stevenage F.C. players
West Ham United F.C. players
Bristol City F.C. players
Barnet F.C. players
Sheffield Wednesday F.C. players
Lincoln City F.C. players
Notts County F.C. players
English Football League players
National League (English football) players
Tottenham Hotspur F.C. non-playing staff
Fulham F.C. non-playing staff
AFC Bournemouth non-playing staff
Association football goalkeeping coaches